Triplicate is the 38th studio album by Bob Dylan, released by Columbia Records on March 31, 2017. As with most of Dylan's 21st century output, he produced the album himself under the pseudonym Jack Frost.

Like Dylan's previous two studio albums, Triplicate features covers of classic American songs recorded live with his touring band and without the use of overdubs. The album is Dylan's first three-disc album, featuring thirty songs across its three discs, each individually titled and presented in a thematically-arranged 10-song sequence.

Three songs from the album—"I Could Have Told You", "My One and Only Love", and "Stardust"—were released as digital singles, with only the first being made available in promotional CD format. All three were accompanied by videos of the songs being played on a vinyl record player.

As with his previous two albums of American pop standards, Triplicate received widespread critical acclaim. It was nominated at the 60th Annual Grammy Awards in the category of Best Traditional Pop Vocal Album. Despite the favorable reviews, it peaked at number 37 on the Billboard 200 and number 17 on the UK Albums Chart.

Background and recording
Following Shadows in the Night in 2015 and Fallen Angels in 2016, Triplicate was Dylan's third album in three years to consist entirely of "standards" from the Great American Songbook. According to Dylan, the first two albums "only were part of the picture", and he felt it necessary to explore this music in further detail. Although the songs could have fit on two CDs, Dylan wanted each disc to be only 32 minutes long as he believed some of his previous albums had been "overloaded", resulting in a "thin" audio quality when pressed on vinyl records. The three discs were thematically divided, with "one disc foreshadowing the next".

The title and concept of Triplicate are thought by some to be an homage to Frank Sinatra's 1980 Reprise Records 3-LP set Trilogy: Past Present Future, each album of which has a separate title like the three albums of Dylan's set. According to Dylan scholar Alan Fraser, however, "Andreas Volkert has researched the playing cards depicted on the cover of Fallen Angels and discovered they were made by the famous playing card manufacturer Andrew Dougherty and called 'Chinese Dragon Back No. 81'. Andreas has now discovered that Andrew Dougherty also created in 1876 a set of playing cards in which a miniature card was placed in the top left and bottom right corners of the cards called... 'Triplicate'! The original 1876 'Triplicate' cards were reissued in 2014. It's very possible this could be another source of inspiration for Bob's album title".

The songs were recorded in Capitol Studios in Los Angeles with Dylan's touring band, without the use of overdubs. According to Dylan, the songs were performed "tightly" according to written arrangements, and there was virtually no improvisation during the recording sessions.

Release and promotion
Dylan had teased the album's release by performing "Once Upon a Time", a song previously recorded by both Frank Sinatra and Tony Bennett, for the Tony Bennett Celebrates 90: The Best Is Yet to Come concert, which premiered on NBC on December 20, 2016. Actor Steve Buscemi introduced Dylan's performance by noting that Dylan and Bennett "share a friendship based on their mutual interests of music, painting and social activism". Spin Magazine called the performance "gorgeous" the following day.

Triplicate was preceded by the release of three singles—"I Could Have Told You" on January 30, 2017, "My One and Only Love" on February 17, and "Stardust" on March 10. While "I Could Have Told You" was also released on promotional CD, the other singles were released only digitally. All three were featured in videos posted to YouTube of the tracks being played on a vinyl record player, complete with surface noise.

The album was released on March 31 in CD, vinyl, deluxe vinyl, and digital formats. The deluxe vinyl is individually numbered and comes in a hardbound case with swing pockets.

Packaging

Triplicate has the most minimalist cover art of Dylan's entire discography: only the album's title is featured, printed in white lettering and "Goudy Text" font against a glossy, deep purple background. There are two photographs of Dylan on the album's inner sleeves that are credited to John D. Shearer. The package also contains an essay by novelist Tom Piazza, the first time liner notes have appeared in a Dylan studio album since Dylan's self-penned notes for World Gone Wrong in 1993. Among the claims in Piazza's essay is the notion that Dylan is presenting songs that "you may have thought you knew to the final decimal point" but which "you may feel you are hearing for the first time, transfigured". This echoes the theme of "transfiguration" on Dylan's previous album of original material, 2012's Tempest, which Dylan explicitly discussed with Mikal Gilmore in a Rolling Stone interview at the time of that album's release.

Critical reception and legacy

As with his previous two albums of American standards, Triplicate received critical acclaim upon release. At Metacritic, which assigns a normalized rating out of 100 to reviews from critics, the album received an average score of 80, which indicates "generally favorable reviews", based on 21 professional reviews.  At AnyDecentMusic?, which collates critical reviews from more than 50 media sources, the album scored 7.6 points out of 10.

In a review for The Guardian, critic Jon Dennis called Dylan "a prism through which American music is revealed in new and fascinating ways", and that "Dylan is unintimidated by their pedigree" of the chosen material. Mikal Gilmore of Rolling Stone said that Dylan was able to "wield phrasing as effectively as Sinatra himself". Jeremy Winograd of Slant Magazine said that Dylan had "breathed new life into these songs, unearthing, or at least rediscovering, an emotional gravitas within them". Stephen Thomas Erlewine of AllMusic said that the collection "cements his place as one of the most distinctive interpreters of the Great American Songbook".

A few critics gave more lukewarm appraisals of the album. Mike Powell of Pitchfork said that "the ballads, beautiful as they are, sometimes feel static, bereft of that innerverse opened by singers like Johnny Hartman or, say, Willie Nelson, whose own standards album Stardust remains a high point for projects like this". In a review entitled "Bob Dylan should stop crooning and get back to writing songs", Neil McCormick of The Telegraph wrote that "Triplicate is an act of self-indulgence only of interest to completists". He noted that while "you may find yourself drawn into Dylan's peculiar rhythm, surrendering to the delicate mood, and really hearing these gorgeous old songs anew" and that "we might be intrigued to read Picasso's poetry or hear Pinter's songbook but no one needs five volumes of it. Now it is surely time to find out what all of this is bringing to Dylan's own original art. He didn't win the Nobel Prize for crooning".

NJArts critic Jay Lustig considered Triplicate a "mere footnote" to Dylan's career but identified "When the World Was Young" as his favorite song on the album.

When critic Ray Padgett ranked all 52 of the songs from Dylan's American Songbook albums in 2017, six of the top 10 tracks were from Triplicate. The highest rated was "The September of My Years" at number two, about which Padgett wrote, "Accompanied by little more than some steel guitar and [Tony] Garnier’s bass (there it is again), Dylan delivers one of his best-ever vocal performances".

"Why Was I Born?", the album's closing track, was placed 19th on Rolling Stone's 2020 list of Dylan's best songs of the 21st century. In an article accompanying the list, critic Jon Dolan wrote: "Dylan croons, his gruff moan giving these lovelorn riddles an existential weight, as if, having lived deep into his seventies, he’s wondering more urgently than ever how to make his life matter. As always, he makes the story his own".

Commercial performance
Triplicate peaked at number 37 on the Billboard 200, charting for only two weeks before falling off. It also reached number 17 on the UK Albums Chart, spending two weeks on the chart.

Track listing

Charts

Weekly charts

Year-end charts

References

External links
 Q&A on the album from Dylan's site

2017 albums
Bob Dylan albums
Covers albums
Columbia Records albums
Traditional pop albums
Pop albums by American artists
Albums produced by Bob Dylan
Albums recorded at Capitol Studios